Alexis Jordan may refer to:
 Alexis Jordan (born 1992), American singer
 Alexis Jordan (album)
 Alexis Jordan (swimmer) (born 1988), Barbadian swimmer

See also
 Claude Thomas Alexis Jordan (1814–1897), French botanist and taxonomist

Jordan, Alexis